{{DISPLAYTITLE:C22H25FN4O2}}
The molecular formula C22H25FN4O2 (molar mass: 396.458 g/mol, exact mass: 396.1962 u) may refer to:

 PX-2
 Toceranib

Molecular formulas